Monkey Mountain refers to both a hill in Jackson County, Missouri and the nature preserve surrounding it.

Nature preserve

The park is popular among equestrians and hikers for its variety of terrain.  These include marshy lowlands in the northwest, steep heavily-wooded climbs on the east and south sides, rocky outcroppings on the southern side, and a large rolling meadow spreading east from the center of the park.  There are several ponds, streams, and a waterfall.

The park features a 3.5 mile primary loop trail, as well as numerous side trails. The park is accessible from a small gravel lot on the south side or from a softball field parking lot on the north side.

The park was formerly part of Sni-A-Bar Farm that was owned by Kansas City newspaperman, and philanthropist,  William Rockhill Nelson.

References

Protected areas of Jackson County, Missouri
Parks in the Kansas City metropolitan area
Nature reserves in Missouri
Mountains of Missouri
Landforms of Jackson County, Missouri